Qaracabinə is a village in the municipality of Qasbinə in the Balakan Rayon of Azerbaijan.

References

Populated places in Balakan District